Lenia is a family of cellular automata created by Bert Wang-Chak Chan. It is intended to be a continuous generalization of Conway's Game of Life. As a consequence of its continuous, high-resolution domain, the complex autonomous patterns ("lifeforms" or "spaceships") generated in Lenia are described as differing from those appearing in other cellular automata, being "geometric, metameric, fuzzy, resilient, adaptive, and rule-generic". 

Lenia won the 2018 Virtual Creatures Contest at the Genetic and Evolutionary Computation Conference in Kyoto and received an honorable mention for the ALIFE Art Award at ALIFE 2018 in Tokyo.

Rules

Iterative updates

Let  be the lattice or grid containing a set of states . Like many cellular automata, Lenia is updated iteratively; each output state is a pure function of the previous state, such that

Thus .

State sets 
Let  with maximum . This is the state set of the automaton and characterizes the possible states that may be found at each site. Larger  correspond to higher state resolutions in the simulation. Many cellular automata use the lowest possible state resolution, i.e. . Lenia allows for much higher resolutions. For example given , .

Neighborhoods 

For the classic Moore neighborhood used by Game of Life, for instance, ; i.e. a square of size 3 centered on every site. 

In Lenia's case, the neighborhood is instead a ball of radius  centered on a site, which may include the original site itself. 

Note that the neighborhood vectors are not the absolute position of the elements, but rather a set of relative positions (deltas) with respect to any given site.

Local rule 

There are discrete and continuous variants of Lenia. Let  be a vector in  within  representing the position of a given site, and  be the set of sites neighboring . Both variations comprise two stages:

 Using a convolution kernel  to compute the potential distribution .
 Using a growth mapping  to compute the final growth distribution .

The local rules are defined as follows for discrete and continuous Lenia:

Kernel generation 

There are many ways to generate the convolution kernel . The final kernel is the composition of a kernel shell  and a kernel skeleton .

For the kernel shell , Chan gives several functions that are defined radially. Kernel shell functions are unimodal and subject to the constraint  (and typically  as well). Example kernel functions include:

Here,  is the indicator function.

Once the kernel shell has been defined, the kernel skeleton  is used to expand it and compute the actual values of the kernel by transforming the shell into a series of concentric rings. The height of each ring is controlled by a kernel peak vector , where  is the rank of the parameter vector. Then the kernel skeleton  is defined as

The final kernel  is therefore

Growth mappings 

The growth mapping , which is analogous to an activation function, may be any function that is unimodal, nonmonotonic, and accepts parameters . Examples include

Game of Life 

Patterns 

By varying the convolutional kernel, the growth mapping and the initial condition, over 400 "species" of "life" have been discovered in Lenia, displaying "self-organization, self-repair, bilateral and radial symmetries, locomotive dynamics, and sometimes chaotic nature". Chan has created a taxonomy for these patterns.

Related work 

Other works have noted the strong similarity between cellular automata update rules and convolutions. Indeed, these works have focused on reproducing cellular automata using simplified convolutional neural networks. Mordvintsev et al. investigated the emergence of self-repairing pattern generation. Gilpin found that any cellular automaton could be represented as a convolutional neural network, and trained neural networks to reproduce existing cellular automata

In this light, cellular automata may be seen as a special case of recurrent convolutional neural networks. Lenia's update rule may also be seen as a single-layer convolution (the "potential field" ) with an activation function (the "growth mapping" ). However, Lenia uses far larger, fixed, kernels and is not trained via gradient descent.

See also 

 Conway's Game of Life
 Cellular automaton
Self-replication
Pattern formation
Morphogenesis

External links 

 The Github repository for Lenia
Chan's website for Lenia
An invited seminar at Stanford given by Chan

References 

Cellular automaton rules